Christian Hartmann may refer to

 Christian Hartmann (composer), (1910 – 1985), Norwegian composer
 Christian Hartmann (historian) (b. 1959), German historian